Ctenucha nantana is a moth of the family Erebidae. It is found in Peru.

References

nantana
Moths described in 1864